Sanders Commings (born March 8, 1990) is an American professional baseball outfielder and former American football cornerback. Prior to his baseball career, he played college football at Georgia and was drafted by the Kansas City Chiefs in the fifth round of the 2013 NFL Draft. Commings is currently a free agent after being released from the Atlanta Braves organization.

Early years
Commings was born in Augusta, Georgia.  He attended Westside High School in Augusta, and played high school football for the Westside Patriots. As a junior in 2006, he recorded seven interceptions. As a senior in 2007, he missed five games with a cracked fibula but still tallied three interceptions, 41 tackles, 109 rushing yards, 248 receiving yards, and four receiving touchdowns. He also played baseball, where as a senior, he batted .520 with 15 home runs, 40 runs batted in and 18 stolen bases and was a 37th round draft pick of the Arizona Diamondbacks in the 2008 MLB Draft.

College career
While attending the University of Georgia, Commings played for coach Mark Richt's Georgia Bulldogs football team between 2008 and 2012.  During his college career, he appeared in 58 games, starting 34 of them, and accumulated 154 tackles (113 solo), six tackles for loss, 17 pass break-ups, and eight interceptions.

Professional career
Commings was drafted by the Kansas City Chiefs in the fifth round, 134th overall pick, of the 2013 NFL Draft.

On July 23, 2013, Commings fractured his left collarbone during training camp practice and was expected to be sidelined anywhere from two to six weeks. On July 30, 2014, he broke his ankle during training camp, which required surgery. On September 5, 2015, Commings was waived by the Chiefs with an injury settlement.

Baseball career

In 2017, Commings trained with Jerry Hairston Jr., in an attempt to return to baseball, a sport Commings had not played since high school.

In February, Commings signed a minor league deal with the Atlanta Braves. The deal came with a $100,000 signing bonus. After a brief stint with the Danville Braves of the Appalachian League, Commings was released on July 3.

References

External links
 Georgia Bulldogs bio

1990 births
Living people
American football defensive backs
Georgia Bulldogs football players
Players of American football from Georgia (U.S. state)
Kansas City Chiefs players
Danville Braves players